The 1931 Staten Island Stapletons season was their third in the National Football League. The team failed to improve on their previous output of 5–5–2, winning only four games. Playing seven games in the month of November, they finished seventh in the league.

Schedule

Standings

References

Staten Island Stapletons seasons
Staten Island Stapletons